Chulman Neryungri Airport  is a civilian airport in Yakutia, Russia located 8 km north of Chulman and 40 km north of Neryungri.
The IATA code NER and the Russian internal code НРГ also refers to the city of Neryungri.

The airport services up to medium-sized airliners.  Chulman is designated as one of several emergency airfields for commercial airline cross-polar routes or ETOPS 180/207 Diversion airport.

Airlines and destinations

External links

 Airport Neryungri (Chulman)  Aviateka.Handbook

References

Airports built in the Soviet Union
Airports in the Sakha Republic